Melodifestivalen 2008 was the 47th Melodifestivalen, and the selection process for the 48th song to represent Sweden at the Eurovision Song Contest.
A new rule—Lex Agnes—went into effect in 2008 calling for each submitted entry to include a document containing all information relevant to the song. It was named after Agnes Carlsson, who was disqualified from the 2007 competition for publicly revealing details of her song before the deadline.

Format

Melodifestivalen 2008 included 32 songs split up into four heats with eight participants in each. The heats were held between 9 February and 1 March 2008 and at each, the two top placing songs went to the final, while the third and fourth place songs went to the Andra Chansen (Second Chance Round). At the Andra Chansen, held on 8 March 2008, the eight songs paired off in two rounds with the two winners at the end of the night qualifying for the final. The final was held on 15 March 2008 and included the eight songs from the heats along with the two from the Andra Chansen to make ten songs in all. The winner and selected entrant for the Eurovision Song Contest was then chosen by (insert voting process here).

It was hosted by Kristian Luuk, who also hosted the 2007 event. Luuk was assisted by Björn Gustafsson and Nour El-Refai.

Preselection

The deadline for the submission of songs was 25 September 2007, and 3,434 songs were submitted, a new record. The titles and composers of the 28 semifinalists (excluding the wildcards) were announced on 10 and 11 December 2007. The wildcards were announced in January 2008.

Schedule

Competition

The semifinals for Melodifestivalen 2008 began on 9 February 2008. There were five semifinals in Gothenburg, Västerås, Linköping, Karlskrona and Kiruna (Andra Chansen) leading up to the final at the Globen on 15 March 2008. Nearly four million votes were cast in total, raising over 5.7 million kronor (€605,000) for charity.

In the four heats, the top two songs of the eight competing went directly through to the final. The third and fourth-placed songs went to the Andra Chansen round. Two rounds of televoting selected the qualifiers, the first round selectiong the top five songs with the second round choosing the two finalists and two songs to go to the Andra Chansen round.

Heat 1 

The first heat of Melodifestivalen was held at the Scandinavium in Gothenburg on 9 February 2008. Eight songs in total competed, seven songs which had been submitted to SVT, along with one of the four wildcards.

The two songs that progressed automatically to the final were "Thank You" by Amy Diamond, the wildcard, and "I Love Europe" by Christer Sjögren. The two songs that passed to the Andra Chansen round were "Line of Fire" by E-Type & The Poodles and "Visst finns mirakel" by Suzzie Tapper.

Heat 2 

The second heat was held on 16 February 2008, at the ABB Arena Nord in Västerås. Again eight songs competed in total, seven songs which had been submitted to SVT and one of the four wildcards.

The two songs that progressed automatically to the final were "Empty Room"  by Sanna Nielsen and "Just a Minute" by Rongedal. The two songs that passed to the Andra Chansen round were "One Love" by Andreas Johnson & Carola Häggkvist, the wildcard, and "Love in Stereo" by Ola Svensson.

Heat 3 

The third heat of Melodifestivalen 2008 was held at the Cloetta Center in Linköping on 23 February 2008.

The two songs that progressed directly to the final were "Lay Your Love on Me"  by BWO and "Upp o hoppa" by Frida feat. Headline. The two songs that passed to the Andra Chansen round were "Smiling in Love" by Caracola and "When You Need Me" by Thérèse Andersson. The wildcard entry, "Hallelujah New World" by Eskobar, came last in the televoting and failed to qualify.

Heat 4 

The final heat of Melodifestivalen 2008 before the Andra chansen round was held on 1 March 2008, at the Telenor Arena in Karlskrona.

The final two artists to automatically secure their place in the final were Charlotte Perrelli with "Hero" and Linda Bengtzing with the song "Hur svårt kan det va?". The two artists to proceed to the Andra Chansen round were Sibel Redzep with the song "That Is Where I'll Go" and Nordman with the song "I lågornas sken". The wildcard entry for this heat was Niklas Strömstedt with the song "För många ord om kärlek", which came last in the televoting.

Andra Chansen round

The third and fourth placed songs in each semifinal perform in Andra Chansen (Second Chance) round. Eight songs performed, paired off against each other. The winners of the first two pairings compete against each other in the first final, while the winners of the other two compete in the second. The winners of the two final pairings go through to the final.

The two winners of Andra Chansen that went on to the final were Sibel Redzep with the song "That Is Where I'll Go" and Nordman with the song "I lågornas sken".

First Round

Second Round

Final
The final of Melodifestivalen 2008 was held on 15 March 2008 at the Globe Arena in Stockholm. The eight direct qualifiers and the two Andra Chansen winner competed in the final, where the 11 regional juries of Sweden, along with televoting, selected the winner that would represent Sweden in the Eurovision Song Contest 2008.

The winner of Melodifestivalen 2008 was Charlotte Perrelli with the song "Hero", receiving a total of 114 points from the juries and 110 points from the televote. The winner of the televote, however, was Sanna Nielsen with "Empty Room".

Ratings

References

External links

 Official website
 Poplight.se: Melodifestivalen 2008 (official website of the Melodifestivalen Tour 2008)
Official site for the preselection
SVT Television of Sweden in English

2008
2008 Swedish television seasons
2008 in Swedish music
2008 song contests
February 2008 events in Europe
March 2008 events in Europe
2000s in Stockholm
2000s in Gothenburg
Events in Stockholm
Events in Gothenburg
Events in Karlskrona
Events in Västerås
Events in Linköping
Events in Kiruna